World Wide Rebel Songs is the third full-length studio album by The Nightwatchman, the alter ego of Tom Morello. It was released on August 29, 2011, through Morello's new label New West Records, and like his previous release Union Town, was self-produced.

The album features fellow Street Sweeper Social Club members Carl Restivo and Eric Gardner on guitar and drums, respectively, as well as SSSC bassist Dave Gibbs on backing vocals.

The album's cover is a homage to the cover image on protest singer Phil Ochs' Gunfight at Carnegie Hall.

Critical response
Spin gave it a score of 5/10, calling it, "a Dylan/Guthrie/Seeger/Bragg love letter that fearlessly tangoes betwixt the admirable and the absurd. Only the electric 'It Begins Tonight,' righteous of riff and bonkers of solo, plays to his strengths; the rest is like watching Michael Jordan bat .235 in Birmingham."

Track listing

Personnel
The Nightwatchman (Tom Morello) - vocals, guitar, mandolin, harmonica
Carl Restivo - guitar, keyboards, backing vocals
Chris Joyner - keyboards
Jonny Polonsky - toy piano
Eric Gardner - drums, percussion
Ben Harper - vocals on "Save the Hammer for the Man"
Dave Gibbs - backing vocals
Anne Preven - backing vocals

References

2011 albums
The Nightwatchman albums
New West Records albums